A French Connection is a cocktail made with equal parts Cognac and Amaretto liqueur. The cocktail is named for the Gene Hackman film of the same name.

See also
 List of cocktails

References

Cocktails with brandy
Cocktails with liqueur